Dicerogastra is a genus of moths of the family Noctuidae.

Selected species
Dicerogastra chersotoides (Wiltshire, 1956)

References
Natural History Museum Lepidoptera genus database

Hadeninae